Nekash is an Ethiopian theatrical drama which was firstly seen on 3 April 1991 in Addis Ababa Municipal Culture and Theater Hall. It is written by Yohannes Birhanu, directed by Tefera Worku and produced by Tesfa ye Kine-tibeb Enterprise. Nekash is returned to the stage of Hager Fikir Theatre after 28 years on 10 April 2019.

Synopsis 
Nekash glimpse the evil doings in the health centers. Its central focuses on the cruel personnel who uses the career for an evil purpose and discouraging them. It exposes the corruption in the supply of medicine, body market, and robbery.

Casts 

 Fantu Mandoye
 Alazar Samuel
 Firehwote Bahiru
 Abirar Abdo
 Debesh Temesgen
 Bayush Alemayehu
 Solomon Hagos
 Shimelis Legas and 15 others

References 

Ethiopian plays
1991 plays